Toot Hill School is a coeducational secondary school and sixth form, located in Bingham in the English county of Nottinghamshire, built in 1969. The school is a member of the Nova Education Trust and has a student population of almost 2000 people.

The most recent Ofsted inspection was the 7th of December 2011 resulting in an outstanding rating. In 2012 Toot Hill was ranked as the best school nationally.

Notable alumni
 Chris Urbanowicz - Guitarist from Editors
 Joe Heyes - Professional rugby union player for Leicester Tigers and England Rugby
 Daniel Taylor (journalist) -  British football journalist
 Harrison Dowzell - West End Performer best known for appearing as Billy in Billy Elliot the Musical
 Julian Marshall - Head of music and podcasts content strategy at YouTube and former NME / Radio 1 journalist.

References

Secondary schools in Nottinghamshire
Academies in Nottinghamshire
Bingham, Nottinghamshire